Dmitrij Vaľukevič (born 31 May 1981 in Petrozavodsk) is a Belarusian-born Slovak triple jumper. He is son of Gennadiy Valyukevich.

Achievements

References

1981 births
Living people
Belarusian male triple jumpers
Slovak male triple jumpers
Athletes (track and field) at the 2004 Summer Olympics
Athletes (track and field) at the 2008 Summer Olympics
Olympic athletes of Belarus
Olympic athletes of Slovakia
People from Petrozavodsk